Boronia excelsa is a plant in the citrus family Rutaceae and is endemic to a small area in Far North Queensland. It is an erect shrub with woolly-hairy branches, simple, stalkless, more or less hairless leaves, and pink to white, four-petalled flowers.

Description
The leaves are much paler on the lower surface.

Taxonomy and naming
Boronia excelsa was first formally described in 1999 by Marco F. Duretto who published the description in  the journal Austrobaileya from a specimen collected on the Mount Windsor Tableland. The specific epithet (excelsa) is a Latin word meaning "high" or "lofty" referring to the higher altitudes where this species occurs.

Distribution and habitat
This boronia grows in wet forests and near the edges of rainforest above  and is restricted to the Mount Windsor Tableland.

Conservation
This boronia is classified as "least concern" by the Queensland Government Department of Environment and Heritage Protection.

References 

excelsa
Flora of Queensland
Plants described in 2003
Taxa named by Marco Duretto